Loophole is a 1954 American  film noir crime drama starring Barry Sullivan and Dorothy Malone. The film was directed by former editor Harold D. Schuster. Mary Beth Hughes plays the film's femme fatale. It was shot in black-and-white and produced by Allied Artists Pictures, a company that generally specialized in B-movies.

Plot
A man posing as a bank examiner steals $50,000 from teller Mike Donovan's cash drawer. Because Donovan does not immediately report the shortage after he discovers it, he is accused of theft and fired by the bank.

Donovan is prevented from finding other employment by Gus Slavin, an insurance investigator and  former cop who informs each of Donovan's next employers that Donovan is a thief who should be fired. Because of Slavin's intimidation, Donovan loses the few jobs that he is able to obtain, followed by his home and nearly his marriage.

Despite many setbacks, Donovan tries to clear his name, but even his wife does not believe that he will succeed. However, the real culprit is identified and Donovan reclaims his life and his old job.

Cast
 Barry Sullivan as Mike Donovan
 Dorothy Malone as Ruthie Donovan
 Charles McGraw as Gus Slavin
 Don Haggerty as Neil Sanford
 Mary Beth Hughes as Vera
 Don Beddoe as Herman Tate
 Dayton Lummis as Jim Starling
 Joanne Jordan as Georgia Hoard
 John Eldredge as Frank Temple
 Richard Reeves as Pete Mazurki / Tanner

Reception

Film noir analysis
Film critic Dennis Schwartz explains why Loophole is considered a film noir: "The poignancy of the story is in how an innocent, hard-working person like Mike, could have his whole life turned upside-down over an incident where he makes an error in judgment. When he tells his boss (Lummis) about it, he has no explanation why he didn't report it immediately except he couldn't understand how so much money was missing. This slip-up is why Mike becomes a noir protagonist, though he doesn't have the dark side to his character this genre usually calls for...[and] his life turns into hell when, even though he is not charged with anything, the bonding company that must insure him cancels his certification and the bank is forced to fire him. Not only can't he get bonded so he can get another teller's job, but the bond company puts a mean-spirited insurance investigator on his tail, Gus Slavin (Charles McGraw). Slavin is convinced Mike is guilty and tails him everywhere, and when Mike gets a job he informs the boss on him and Mike is always promptly fired."

References

External links
 
 
 
 

1954 films
1954 crime drama films
American mystery films
American black-and-white films
1950s English-language films
Film noir
Films directed by Harold D. Schuster
Films scored by Paul Dunlap
American crime drama films
Allied Artists films
1950s American films